The Sussex Pledge was a promise made by Germany to the United States in 1916, during World War I before the latter entered World War I. Early in 1915, Germany had instituted a policy of unrestricted submarine warfare, allowing armed merchant ships but not passenger ships to be torpedoed without warning.

The ship was severely damaged and about 80 people died, including the famous Spanish pianist and composer Enrique Granados.

Although no US citizen was killed in this attack, it prompted US President Woodrow Wilson to declare that if Germany continued the practice, the United States would break diplomatic relations with Germany.

Fearing the American entry into the war, Germany tried to appease the United States by issuing on May 4, 1916 the Sussex pledge, which promised a change in Germany's naval warfare policy. These were the primary elements of the pledge:
Passenger ships would not  be targeted.
Merchant ships would not be sunk until the presence of weapons had been established, if necessary by a search of the ship
Merchant ships would not be sunk without provision for the safety of passengers and crew.

In 1917, Germany became convinced that it could defeat the Allied Forces by instituting unrestricted submarine warfare before the United States could enter the war. The Sussex pledge was, therefore, rescinded in January 1917, which started the decisive stage of the so-called First Battle of the Atlantic. The resumption of unrestricted submarine warfare and the Zimmermann Telegram caused the United States to declare war on Germany on April 6, 1917.

References
 The Life and Letters of Walter H. Page, by Burton J. Hendrick
 U-S-History.com on the Sussex
 American History:  A Survey Eleventh Edition by Alan Brinkley, © 2003 by The McGraw-Hill Companies
Tony Bridgeland. Outrage at Sea: Naval Atrocities in the First World War. Pen and Sword Books, 2002. 
Conway's All the World's Fighting Ships 1906–1921'' (Conway Maritime Press, 1985)

Footnotes

Atlantic operations of World War I
Naval warfare